Snow King Observatory and Planetarium is a planned astronomy facility on US Forest Service property at the  summit of Snow King Mountain in Jackson, Wyoming. In January 2020, Bridger–Teton National Forest administrators released a draft environmental impact statement regarding the proposed facility. A Nevada–Wyoming amateur astronomer, Samuel Singer, created the nonprofit Wyoming Stargazing in 2014 to foster the project. Designer, Jakub Galczynski , joined Samuel Singer in 2015 to design and draft the Snow King Observatory. 

The planetarium would be co-housed with a restaurant, ski patrol, and other amenities in a  building at the summit. The observatory would be a separate  building.

See also
 List of astronomical observatories
 List of planetariums

References

External links

Astronomical observatories in Wyoming
Buildings and structures in Jackson, Wyoming
Planetaria in the United States